The LXXXII Army Corps was an army corps of the German Wehrmacht during World War II. It was formed in 1942 and existed until 1945.

History 
The LXXXII Army Corps was created on 25 May 1942 from the renamed Höheres Kommando z. b. V. XXXVII, which had in turn been created on 20 October 1939 from the Grenzschutz-Abschnittkommando 30 and additionally served since 1 July 1940 as Befehlshaber der Truppen in Holland.

The initial commander of the LXXXII Army Corps was Alfred Böhm-Tettelbach. The corps, assigned to the 15th Army under Army Group D, was originally headquartered at Aire-sur-la-Lys. Böhm-Tettelbach was replaced as corps commander by Ernst Dehner on 1 November 1942. Dehner was in turn replaced by Johann Sinnhuber on 10 July 1943.

The corps remained on defensive duty in France until the Normandy landings of June 1944. By the end of August 1944, the corps had been transferred to the 1st Army and deployed in the Loire region. Walter Hörnlein became the commander of the corps on 7 September 1944. The corps was subsequently driven back to the Saar region.

After a transfer to the 7th Army, the LXXXII Army Corps, now under command of Walter Hahm, was deployed in Hesse and Thuringia in April 1945, shortly before German surrender. Its final commander was Theodor Tolsdorff, who had only held that post since 20 April 1945. Before him, Walther Lucht had held command of the LXXXII Army Corps for five days between 15 April and 20 April 1945.

Structure

Noteworthy individuals 

 Alfred Böhm-Tettelbach, corps commander of the LXXXII Army Corps (27 May 1942 – 31 October 1942).
 Ernst Dehner, corps commander of the LXXXII Army Corps (1 November 1942 – 10 July 1943).
 Johann Sinnhuber, corps commander of the LXXXII Army Corps (10 July 1943 – 7 September 1944).
 Walter Hörnlein, corps commander of the LXXXII Army Corps (7 September 1944 – 1 December 1944).
 Walter Hahm, corps commander of the LXXXII Army Corps (1 December 1944 – 15 April 1945).
 Walther Lucht, corps commander of the LXXXII Army Corps (15 April 1945 – 20 April 1945).
 Theodor Tolsdorff, corps commander of the LXXXII Army Corps (20 April 1945 – May 1945).

References 

Corps of Germany in World War II
Military units and formations established in 1942
Military units and formations disestablished in 1945